Frauke Dirickx (born 3 January 1980 in Halle) is a volleyball player from Belgium. She was the captain for the national team from-2007-2012. She finished in seventh place with the Women's National Team at the 2007 European Championship in Belgium and Luxembourg. She is 1.86 m and plays as setter for Spes Volley Conegliano.

With Fenerbahçe Acibadem she won the 2009–10 Turkish League, Cup and Super Cup Championship.

Clubs
  Isola Tongeren (1996–1997)
  Kärcher Herentals (1997–2000)
  Minetti Vicenza (2000–2002)
  Cerdisa Reggio Emilia (2002–2003)
  Kab Holding Sassuolo (2003–2004)
  Minetti Infoplus Vicenza (2004–2005)
  Grupo 2002 Murcia (2005–2007)
  Futura Volley Busto Arsizio (2007–2008)
  Metal Galaţi (2008–2009)
  Fenerbahçe Acıbadem (2009–2010)
  Spes Volley Conegliano (2010–2011)
  Dabrowa Górnicza (2011–2013)
  Impel Wroclaw (2013–2014)
  River Volley Piacenza (2014–2015)
  Bursa BBSK (2015–2016)

Awards

Individuals

Clubs
 2001 Italian Supercup –  Champion, with Minetti Vicenza
 2006 Spanish Supercup –  Champion, with Grupo 2002 Murcia
 2007 Spanish Queen Cup –  Champion Grupo Murcia 2002
 2007 Top Teams Cup –  Champion, with Grupo 2002 Murcia
 2007 Spanish Superliga –  Champion, with Grupo 2002 Murcia
 2009 Romanian Championship –  Champion, with Metal Galaţi
 2010 Turkish Super Cup –  Champion, with Fenerbahçe Acıbadem
 2010 Turkish Cup –  Champion, with Fenerbahçe Acıbadem
 2010 CEV Champions League –  Runner-Up, with Fenerbahçe Acıbadem
 2010 Turkish Championship –  Champion, with Fenerbahçe Acıbadem

References

External links
 Frauke Dirickx at the International Volleyball Federation
 
  

1980 births
Living people
Belgian women's volleyball players
Fenerbahçe volleyballers
Belgian expatriate sportspeople in Turkey
Belgian expatriate sportspeople in Spain
Setters (volleyball)
People from Halle, Belgium
Sportspeople from Flemish Brabant